William Everson may refer to:
 William Everson (poet) (1912–1994), American poet of the San Francisco Renaissance
 William K. Everson (1929–1996), English-American film preservationist, historian and academic
 William G. Everson (1879–1954), United States Army general
 William Everson (Wisconsin politician) (1841–1928), American farmer and politician
 Bill Everson (William Aaron Everson, 1906–1966), Welsh rugby union player